Çemişgezek is a municipality (belde) and seat of Çemişgezek District of Tunceli Province, Turkey. The mayor is Levent Metin Yıldız (AKP).

The town had a population of 3,009 in 2021 and is populated by both Kurds and Turks.

The town is divided into the neighborhoods of Çukur, Hacı Cami, Hamamatik, Kale, Mescit, Tepebaşı and Yenimahalle.

Notable natives 

 Aurora Mardiganian – Armenian genocide survivor, writer of Ravished Armenia.
 John I Tzimiskes - Byzantine emperor of Armenian origin
 Aynur Doğan – Kurdish singer
 Diyap Yıldırım – Kurdish politician

See also 
 Emirate of Çemişgezek

References

External links

Populated places in Çemişgezek District
Kurdish settlements in Tunceli Province